An over-arm position is a body position in which a person's arms are extended over their shoulders or behind their head. This may take place, for example, during work or sporting activity, and is used in stretching exercises or during meditation besides other activities.  In wrestling, for example, nelson holds are over-arm holds, in a contest for physical dominance. In cricket, Overarm bowling is the norm. Also, in law enforcement, the raising of the arms above or behind the head is a gesture of surrender or submission, as it is in a military situation.

See also
 Body language
 
 Overarm bowling

External links

Human positions
Nonverbal communication